Kisor v. Wilkie, No. 18-15, 588 U.S. ___ (2019), was a US Supreme Court case related to the interpretation by an executive agency of its own ambiguous regulations. The case involved a veteran who had been denied some benefits from the United States Department of Veterans Affairs due to the agency's interpretation of its regulations. The case challenges the "Auer deference" established in the 1997 case Auer v. Robbins, in which the judiciary branch of the government normally defers to an agency's own interpretation of its own regulations in resolving matters of law. Lower courts, including the Federal Appeals Circuit Courts, ruled against the veteran, acknowledging the Auer deference.

The case sought to have Auer overturned. The Court issued its decision in June 2019 that Kisor lacked sufficient motivation and rationale to overturn Auer on precedent, but did reverse and remand the veteran's case to be reheard with stricter adherence to the principles of whether the Auer deference did apply in the veteran's case. However, the Court did state that there are times where the Auer deference may be inappropriate, and outlined rules for lower courts to use to as a metric.

Legal background 
The 1984 case Chevron U.S.A., Inc. v. Natural Resources Defense Council, Inc. introduced what is known as the Chevron deference, a doctrine frequently applied in federal courts. In essence, the Chevron deference is used to defer to an executive agency's interpretation of the "construction of the statute which it administers", as long as Congress has not passed any legislation to address the statute, and the interpretation is a "permissible construction" of the statute. This was further established in Auer v. Robbins in 1997, which stated the Chevron deference would also apply to interpretations of regulations established by the agency, as long as the interpretation is not inconsistent with the regulation. The decision of Auer had been previously mirrored in Bowles v. Seminole Rock & Sand Co., but most of the federal courts have adopted the term Auer deference.

Since the ruling on Auer, many legal commentators, starting with John Manning, later made Dean of Harvard Law School, have expressed concern that this ruling gives executive agencies too much power, able to draw judicial power in a growing administrative state. Some have found agencies more likely to write vague regulations so that they can be interpreted as needed in future legal challenges. 

Justice Antonin Scalia, who wrote the majority opinion for Auer, later stated his regret for writing that decision, calling it "one of the worst opinions in the history of this country," and questioned it in a concurring opinion in Talk America v. Michigan Bell Telephone Co. Justice Clarence Thomas had written in his dissenting opinion on the denial of petition for United Student Aid Funds v. Bible (Docket 15–861) that members of the Court, including himself, Chief Justice John Roberts and Justices Samuel Alito, Anthony Kennedy and Antonin Scalia, had "repeatedly called for [Auer's] reconsideration in an appropriate case". Observers also identified that Justice Neil Gorsuch, while he served on the United States Court of Appeals for the Tenth Circuit,  authored decisions that called for a re-evaluation of Auer.

Case background 
James Kisor is a veteran Marine from the Vietnam War, and had been a participant in Operation Harvest Moon. In 1982, stating that he had developed posttraumatic stress disorder (PTSD) from his service, Kisor sought disability benefits from the United States Department of Veterans Affairs (VA). On review, the VA disagreed he had PTSD and denied him disability benefits. Kisor appealed that decision in 2006, this time with additional documentation that was not available in 1982, including his service record. The VA granted benefits with this information, but with a start date of 2006 rather than 1982. The VA interpreted its own regulations that the new documents presented were not "relevant" to his first request in 1982, despite Kisor stating that the VA affirmed his PTSD from his combat record forms. Both the Court of Appeals for Veterans Claims and the United States Court of Appeals for the Federal Circuit affirmed the VA's decision, affirming that Auer gave the VA the ability to define the meaning of "relevant" in this regulation, and putting the onus on Kisor to demonstrate it was not a valid interpretation. Kisor's petition for the Federal Circuit to rehear the case en banc was denied, with three judges dissenting.

Supreme Court 
Kisor filed petition for writ of certiorari to the Supreme Court in April 2018, asking two questions. First, whether Auer, as well as the related case Bowles v. Seminole Rock & Sand Co. (1945) should be overturned, and second, whether the canon of interpretation requiring courts to construe interpretive ambiguity in favor of veterans trumps Auer deference. The Supreme Court granted the petition on the first question only, with oral arguments heard on March 27, 2019. During oral arguments, while the Court recognized the issues with allowing agencies to interpret their own policies without reasonable public input and how Auer contributed towards the administrative state, they also expressed concern that such agencies, and not the judiciary, are typically the only appropriate entities with expert knowledge in the agency's field to make appropriate interpretations, citing the example of a complex chemical requirement established under the United States Food and Drug Administration. Further, the Justices expressed concern with fractured interpretation of an agency's regulations within other agencies should Auer be overruled. Justice Stephen Breyer half-jokingly expressed concern that a poor decision in this case could be the "greatest judicial power grab since Marbury v. Madison".

The Court issued its decision, its majority decision written by Justice Elena Kagan, on June 26, 2019, reversing and remanding the case back to the Federal Circuit Court. Kagan's ruling specifically did not overrule Auer or Seminole Rock, as Kisor's case lacked the proper motivation for doing so and to overcome stare decisis, though some dissents-in-part from Justices Thomas, Alito, Gorsuch, and Kavanaugh indicated they would have ruled in favor of overturning these. 

Justice Elena Kagan, writing for the majority, issued an opinion by herself and the other liberal justices, joined partly by Chief Justice Roberts. Kagan started with reiterating the justification of Auer, namely, the court's belief of implicit Congressional intent. The court infers that the agency can best state the regulation's authorial intent, has the expertise to make what's essentially a policy decision, and can promote uniformity. Justice Kagan further stated that while the decision upholds the Auer deference, "we reinforce its limits." Kagan's opinion stated that the Auer deference is "sometimes appropriate and sometimes not," and states that the Auer deference can only be considered when "a regulation is genuinely ambiguous," the court has exhausted traditional tools of statutory construction, "the agency's construction of its rule must still be reasonable", the rule must be an authoritative statement by agency higher-up officials; it must implicate agency expertise; and it cannot create unfair surprise. 

Strikingly, the chief justice joins only the portion of the majority opinion that limited the application of Auer. He did not join the parts of the opinion which stated the justifications or Auer and declined to overrule it.

The Court did unanimously rule on the judgement of the specific matter of Kisor's case with the VA that the Federal Circuit did not use all the tools it had at hand to property analyze the interpretation of the VA's regulations, thus vacating the prior decision and remanding it for review in light of the limitations set forth for the Auer deference.

See also
List of United States Supreme Court cases, volume 588

References

Further reading

External links
 

2019 in United States case law
United States Supreme Court cases
United States Supreme Court cases
Post-traumatic stress disorder
United States Department of Veterans Affairs
United States administrative case law